Free For All Tour Demo is a 2005 album by Pigface.

Track listing
 Steamroller
 Machine Sex
 I am War Again
 Crime Time
 InsectSuspect
 I Lie
 104
 Girls Unite
 Warpath
Instant Exorcism
Human Resources
 Sleeping Beats
 Heart of Joy
 New Romantic Circuitry
 In League
 Vertigo
 Good Morning, Firecracker

2005 albums
Pigface albums
Demo albums